Christoph Pfingsten (born 20 November 1987) is a German former racing cyclist, who competed as a professional from 2009 to 2021. He rode at the 2013 UCI Road World Championships. He was named in the startlist for the 2016 Vuelta a España. In May 2018, he was named in the startlist for the 2018 Giro d'Italia.

Major results

Road

2006
 2nd Overall Mainfranken-Tour
2007
 1st Stage 3 Grand Prix Cycliste de Gemenc
2009
 4th Overall Tour de Berlin
 5th Eschborn–Frankfurt Under–23
 7th Overall Thüringen Rundfahrt der U23
2010
 3rd Overall Ringerike GP
1st Stage 5
 4th Rund um Düren
 8th Arno Wallaard Memorial
2011
 9th Overall Delta Tour Zeeland
2012
 3rd Overall Olympia's Tour
2013
 1st Prologue (TTT) Volta a Portugal
 3rd Overall Circuit des Ardennes
 3rd Ronde van Overijssel
2014
 4th Overall Flèche du Sud
1st Prologue
 8th Overall Circuit des Ardennes
2015
 10th Scheldeprijs
2016
 5th Overall Danmark Rundt
2018
 1st Stage 1 (TTT) Czech Cycling Tour
 7th Gran Piemonte
2019
 2nd Rund um Köln

Grand Tour general classification results timeline

Cyclo-cross

2004–2005
 2nd National Junior Championships
 3rd  UCI Junior World Championships
 3rd  UEC European Junior Championships
2008–2009
 2nd  UCI Under-23 World Championships
2009–2010
 2nd National Championships
 2nd Int. Radcross
 3rd Internationale Döhlauer Crossrennen
2010–2011
 1st Internationale Döhlauer Crossrennen
 2nd National Championships
 2nd Velka Cena Mesta Tabora
 Toi Toi Cup
1st Uničov
3rd Loštice
2011–2012
 1st  National Championships
 1st Overall Toi Toi Cup
1st Holé Vrchy
1st Louny
1st Hlinsko
 1st Frankfurter Rad-Cross
2012–2013
 2nd Frankfurter Rad-Cross
 3rd National Championships

References

External links

1987 births
Living people
German male cyclists
Sportspeople from Potsdam
Universiade medalists in cycling
Universiade silver medalists for Germany
Medalists at the 2011 Summer Universiade
Cyclo-cross cyclists
Cyclists from Brandenburg